Pour Lui is Turkish pop singer Ajda Pekkan's fifth studio album, which was released on 17 December 1978 in Turkey. The album was published in France and Turkey as well as in Israel. Three songs are cover versions of Love & Kisses (Track 1 You're The Most Precious Thing In My Life and Track 11 Maybe) and Nicole Croisille (Track 9 En Oubliant Qu'On Était Deux) and one song has been covered by Demis Roussos (Track 7 Si J'Étais Magicien). There are lyricists and composers such as Michel Jouveaux, Jeff Barnel and Danielle Vézolles, whom were among the leading names in French music at the time.

Track listing

References

External links 
 
 Pour Lui - iTunes
 Ajda Pekkan a propos des notes 

Ajda Pekkan albums
1978 albums
Turkish-language albums
French-language albums